Alfonso Brescia (6 January 1930 – 6 June 2001) was an Italian film director. Brescia began working in film against his father's wishes, and eventually directed his first film Revolt of the Praetorians in 1964. Brescia worked in several genres in the Italian film industry, including five science fiction films he directed following the release of Star Wars. Brescia's work slowed down towards the late 1980s, and his last film Club Vacanze could not get distribution.

Biography
Alfonso Brescia was born in Rome on January 6, 1930. Brescia was the son of a film producer and entered the film business against his father's will. His father had him work as a production driver, which involved getting up early to persuade him against entering the business which did not work. He began work as an assistant director as well as working in production offices, eventually directing his first film Revolt of the Praetorians in 1964.

Following the release of Star Wars, he shot five science fiction films in a row, Anno zero: guerra nello spazio, Battaglie negli spazi stellari (aka Battle of the Stars), La guerra dei robot, Star Odyssey and The Beast in Space. The Beast in Space was a science fiction pornography film based on Walerian Borowczyk's The Beast. In the 1980s, with the decline of genre cinema, Brescia's output drastically diminished. His  final works included Iron Warrior and Miami Cops and Omicidio a luci blu.  He directed his last film in 1995, Club Vacanze, which failed to interest a distributor, making it the only film he lost money on.

Brescia died in Rome on May 5, 2001.

Style
Italian film historian Roberto Curti described Brescia as "a hack, but a reliable one". Curti referred to Brescia as "one of the most prolific and versatile Italian filmmakers of the 1970s". Brescia worked in popular film genres of their respective eras in Italy, including sword and sandal films, Westerns, war films, mondo films, gialli, erotic films, superhero films, children's films, erotic films, and science fiction films.

Selected filmography
Note: The films listed as N/A are not necessarily chronological.

Notes

References

External links
 
 

1930 births
2001 deaths
Film directors from Rome
Giallo film directors